This is a list of museums, including botanical collections and gardens, in Ghana.

References

External links
 ICOM - Ghana Partner Museums and Parks in Ghana
 Museums in Africa: Ghana

Ghana
 
Museums
Museums
Museums
Ghana